SMS  is short message service, a form of text-messaging communication based on phones.

SMS may also refer to:

Science and technology
 Smith–Magenis syndrome, a genetic developmental disorder
 SMS (gene), which encodes the spermine synthase enzyme
 Serotonin modulator and stimulator, a type of drug
 Synchronous Meteorological Satellite, a NASA program
 Simultaneous multiple surface, in non-imaging optics

Computing
 Sega Master System, video game console
Sudden Motion Sensor, on Apple notebook computers
 Spectral modeling synthesis, an acoustic modeling approach
 IBM SMS (disambiguation), several IBM hardware and software products
 Super Mario Sunshine, video game

Software
 SMS (hydrology software), surface-water modeling software
 Supervisor Monitoring Scheduler, a Unix/Linux job scheduler
 Systems Management Server, later System Center Configuration Manager, by Microsoft
 Data Facility Storage Management Subsystem (MVS), central component of z/OS, optional in some older forms of MVS
 Data Facility Storage Management Subsystem (MVS)#System Managed Storage, a facility in DFSMS/MVS

Arts and entertainment
SMS (band), a Ukrainian pop band
 SMS (illustrator), British comic book illustrator
 "SMS" (Bangerz), a song from the Miley Cyrus album Bangerz
 S.M.S. portfolios, artists' portfolios
 Shorty McShorts, the host of Shorty McShorts' Shorts
 S. M. Subbaiah Naidu, an Indian music director

Film
 Stop Making Sense, a 1984 concert film by Talking Heads
 Siva Manasula Sakthi, a 2009 Tamil film
 Siva Manasulo Sruthi, a 2012 Telugu film
 SMS (2008 film), a Malayalam-language Indian film

Organizations
 Party of Modern Serbia (Stranka moderne Srbije), a political party in Serbia
 Youth Party of Slovenia (Stranka mladih Slovenije), a Slovenian political party
 Scientific Micro Systems, producer of the SMS300 microcontroller
 SMS Audio, a US headphone manufacturer
 Santa Monica Studio, an American video game developer
 Marine Service Squadron

Education
 Special Music School, New York City, US
 Saint Mary's School (Raleigh, North Carolina), US

Transportation
 Safety management system, in the workplace
 Sainte Marie Airport (IATA code), Madagascar
 Seiner Majestät Schiff (His Majesty's Ship), ship prefix in the Kaiserliche Marine and K.u.K. Kriegsmarine
 Scheduled Maintenance System, of New York City Subway rolling stock

Other uses
 Sawai Mansingh Stadium, a cricket stadium in India
 Skolt Sami language (ISO 639 alpha-3 language code)
 SMS, nonwoven fabrics with spun and melted layers

See also
 SM (disambiguation)